Aurosa is a genus of cnidarians belonging to the family Ulmaridae.

Species:
 Aurosa furcata Haeckel, 1880

References

Ulmaridae
Scyphozoan genera